The 2017 Frisco Bowl was a college football bowl game that was played on December 20, 2017, at Toyota Stadium in Frisco, Texas, United States.  The first annual Frisco Bowl, it featured the Louisiana Tech Bulldogs of Conference USA and the SMU Mustangs of the American Athletic Conference.  It began at 7:00 PM CST and aired on ESPN.  It was one of the 2017–18 bowl games that concluded the 2017 FBS football season.  Sponsored by DXL, a retailer of men's big and tall apparel, the game was officially known as the DXL Frisco Bowl.  The Bulldogs decisively beat the Mustangs by a score of 51–10.

Teams
The game featured the SMU Mustangs against the Louisiana Tech Bulldogs.  It was the fifth all-time meeting between the schools, with Louisiana Tech having led the series 3–1.  The Mustangs and Bulldogs played together in the Western Athletic Conference from 2001 until 2004, when SMU joined Conference USA.  Coincidentally, Conference USA is the conference that Louisiana Tech would join in the same season that SMU joined The American.

SMU Mustangs

This was the sixteenth bowl game in school history for SMU, and the Mustangs' seventh to be played in the Dallas–Fort Worth metroplex.

Louisiana Tech Bulldogs

This was the tenth bowl game in school history for Louisiana Tech, and their fourth consecutive (all wins). It was the Bulldogs' third bowl game to be played in the Dallas–Fort Worth metroplex.

Game summary

Scoring summary

Statistics

References

Further reading

External links

Box score at ESPN

2017–18 NCAA football bowl games
2017
2017
2017
2017 in sports in Texas
December 2017 sports events in the United States